Kar-Mulla is a small agricultural village in Kandahar Province,  Afghanistan. It is located north of  Kandahar. Kar-Mulla lies on a small lake.

See also
Kandahar Province

References

External links

Populated places in Kandahar Province